This list is of the Historic Sites of Japan located within the Urban Prefecture of Ōsaka.

National Historic Sites
As of 17 June 2022, seventy-one Sites have been designated as being of national significance (including two *Special Historic Sites); the Tombs of Chikamatsu Monzaemon cross the prefectural borders with Hyōgo.

Prefectural Historic Sites
As of 15 March 2022, sixty-eight Sites have been designated as being of prefectural importance.

Municipal Historic Sites
As of 1 May 2021, a further ninety Sites have been designated as being of municipal importance, including:

See also

 Cultural Properties of Japan
 Kawachi, Izumi, Settsu Provinces
 Osaka Museum of History
 List of Places of Scenic Beauty of Japan (Ōsaka)
 List of Cultural Properties of Japan - paintings (Ōsaka)

References

External links
 Cultural Properties in Osaka Prefecture

Osaka Prefecture
 Osaka

ja:Category:大阪府にある国指定の史跡